The 2000 Australian Royal Visit Honours for Australia were announced on 5 May 2000.

Royal Victorian Order

Commander of the Royal Victorian Order (CVO)
 His Excellency the Honourable Gordon Samuels, 
 His Excellency the Honourable Sir James Gobbo, 
 His Excellency the Honourable Sir Guy Green, 
 His Excellency Major General Michael Jeffery, 
 Roger Thomas Bagley,

Lieutenant of the Royal Victorian Order (LVO)
 Commander Clifford Donald Lonsdale, 
 Martin Charles Brian Bonsey
 Patricia Jane Logan, 
 Kevin Leslie Skipworth

Member of the Royal Victorian Order (MVO)
 Paul Francis Morrison
 Kevin James Davidson
 Malveen Kelly
 Fiona Mary Birkett
 Kaye Elizabeth Robertson
 Lieutenant Colonel Richard Burr 
 Dale Keady

Royal Victorian Medal (RVM)

Gold
 James Heenan,

Silver
 Andrew John Newland

References

External links

2000 awards in Australia
Orders, decorations, and medals of Australia